Einar Kyllingstad (born 17 July 1965) is a former speedway rider from Norway.

Speedway career 
Kyllingstad is a two times champion of Norway, winning the Norwegian Championship in 1984 and 1985.

He rode in the top tier of British Speedway from 1985 until 1988, riding for the various clubs.

References 

1965 births
Living people
People from Time, Norway
Norwegian speedway riders
King's Lynn Stars riders
Oxford Cheetahs riders
Reading Racers riders
Sheffield Tigers riders
Norwegian expatriate sportspeople in England
Sportspeople from Rogaland